Bay City Blues is an American comedy-drama television series that aired on NBC from October 25 to November 15, 1983. The series stars Michael Nouri, Dennis Franz, and Pat Corley, and was created and produced by Steven Bochco. Eight episodes were produced, but only four were aired prior to its cancellation.

Synopsis

Bay City Blues centers on a Bay City, California minor league baseball team, the Bluebirds. Players varied from young hopefuls to once-great players who were sent to the minors before retirement. Storylines revolve around the players' lives, loves, and problems. Bay City Blues features an ensemble cast of regulars including a then-unknown Sharon Stone, Mykelti Williamson and Dennis Franz.

The series from producer Steven Bochco utilized many actors who had appeared on Hill Street Blues including Franz, Jurasik, Corley and Rodriguez.  After the series' cancellation, Ken Olin joined Hill Street Blues cast in the fall of 1984 and Mykelti Williamson appeared in a recurring role. Michael Nouri portrayed Joe Rohner, the Bluebirds' kindly manager. His love interest on the show was played by Kelly Harmon.

Filming
Filming took place in a parking lot in Pacoima, a neighbourhood town in Los Angeles, California. Production for Bay City Blues was started in August 1983.

Broadcast
Scheduled opposite ABC's Hart to Hart and CBS's Tuesday Night Movies, Bay City Blues drew poor ratings and was pulled from NBC's lineup after airing four of the eight episodes that were produced at 10 pm. The four remaining episodes were aired by selected affiliates in two-hour blocks on Sunday July 1 and Sunday July 8, 1984, after the local news broadcasts. The prime-time run ended up ranking 93rd out of 101 programs, averaging only a 10 household rating and a 17 percent audience share.

The remaining four episodes had not been seen again in prime-time until 2011, when ESPN Classic acquired the rights to the series and aired all eight episodes.

Cast
 Michael Nouri as Joe Rohner
 Ken Olin  as Rocky Padillo
 Dennis Franz as Angelo Carbone
 Pat Corley as Ray Holtz
 Patrick Cassidy as Terry St. Marie
 Bernie Casey as Ozzie Peoples
 Perry Lang as John "Frenchy" Nuckles
 Larry "Flash" Jenkins as Charlie Henderson
 Mykelti Williamson as Deejay Cunningham
 Jeff McCracken as Vic Kresky
 Marco Rodríguez as Bird
 Tony Spiridakis as Lee Jacoby
 Sheree North as Lynn Holtz
 Sharon Stone as Cathy St. Marie
 Michele Greene as Judy Nuckles
 Kelly Harmon as Sunny Hayward
 Eddie Velez as Pepe Garcia

US television ratings

Episodes

References

Citations

Sources

External links

 
 

1983 American television series debuts
1984 American television series endings
1980s American comedy-drama television series
American sports television series
English-language television shows
NBC original programming
Television shows set in Los Angeles County, California
Baseball television series
Television series by MTM Enterprises
Television series created by Steven Bochco